In geometry, the small rhombidodecahedron is a nonconvex uniform polyhedron, indexed as U39. It has 42 faces (30 squares and 12 decagons), 120 edges, and 60 vertices. Its vertex figure is a crossed quadrilateral.

Related polyhedra 

It shares its vertex arrangement with the small stellated truncated dodecahedron and the uniform compounds of 6 or 12 pentagrammic prisms. It additionally shares its edge arrangement with the rhombicosidodecahedron (having the square faces in common), and with the small dodecicosidodecahedron (having the decagonal faces in common).

Small rhombidodecacron

The small rhombidodecacron (or small dipteral ditriacontahedron) is a nonconvex isohedral polyhedron. It is the dual of the small rhombidodecahedron. It is visually identical to the Small dodecacronic hexecontahedron. It has 60 intersecting antiparallelogram faces.

References

External links 
 
 
 Uniform polyhedra and duals

Uniform polyhedra